Ahmed El-Jaouachi (born 13 July 1975) is a retired Tunisian football goalkeeper.

He previously played for a few clubs, including US Monastir, CS Sfaxien and Étoile Sahel with which he participated in the 2007 FIFA Club World Cup.

El-Jaouachi also played a one-match for the Tunisia national football team and participated in the 2002 FIFA World Cup.

References

1975 births
Living people
Tunisian footballers
2002 FIFA World Cup players
Association football goalkeepers
US Monastir (football) players
CS Sfaxien players
Étoile Sportive du Sahel players
2002 African Cup of Nations players
Tunisia international footballers